Les Blancs is a 1970 play by Lorraine Hansberry.

Les Blancs may also refer to:

Les Blancs, nickname for Malian football club Stade Malien
Les Blancs, nickname for a period in the History of the France national football team
Les Blancs-Manteaux; see Order of Servites
Les Blancs Bois arch, a National Trust of Guernsey property

See also
Le Blanc (disambiguation)